Star Wars Jedi: Fallen Order is a 2019 action-adventure game developed by Respawn Entertainment and published by Electronic Arts. The story is set in the Star Wars universe, five years after Star Wars: Episode III – Revenge of the Sith. It follows Jedi Padawan Cal Kestis, who becomes a target of the Galactic Empire and is hunted throughout the galaxy by the Imperial Inquisitors while attempting to complete his training, reconcile with his troubled past, and rebuild the fallen Jedi Order. The player can use Kestis' lightsaber and Force powers to defeat enemies, including stormtroopers, wild beasts and bounty hunters. The game adopts a Metroidvania style of level design where new areas are accessed as Cal unlocks skills and abilities.

The game was directed by Stig Asmussen, who joined Respawn in 2014. The game began development as an original title unrelated to Star Wars, and Electronic Arts felt the action would work well as a Star Wars game, convincing Lucasfilm to authorize and consult on the project. The game's visuals were influenced by Rogue One and Star Wars Rebels, while the combat and levels were inspired by Metroid Prime, Dark Souls, and The Legend of Zelda: Wind Waker. The game's voice cast includes Cameron Monaghan as Cal Kestis and Debra Wilson as his mentor Cere. Ben Burtt provided the voice for Cal's companion droid BD-1, while Forest Whitaker reprised his role from Rogue One as Saw Gerrera. The music, composed by Stephen Barton and Gordy Haab, was recorded at Abbey Road Studios with the London Symphony Orchestra and the Bach Choir of London.

Revealed in May 2016, the game was released for PlayStation 4, Windows, and Xbox One in November 2019, and for PlayStation 5 and Xbox Series X and Series S in June 2021. The game received generally favorable reviews, with critics praising the game's combat, characters, performance, and world design, though it received criticisms for its story, technical issues and lack of polish at release. It was a commercial success, selling more than 10 million copies by 2020. It was nominated for several end-of-the-year accolades, including Best Action/Adventure Game at The Game Awards 2020. A sequel, Star Wars Jedi: Survivor, is set for release in April 2023.

Gameplay

Star Wars: Jedi Fallen Order is an action-adventure video game played from a third-person perspective. The player can use their lightsaber to strike at enemies, or block incoming attacks. Blocking an attack depletes a character's block meter, opening them up to attack when the meter hits zero. If the player blocks just before an attack, this will parry the attack or deflect a projectile, causing their opponent's block meter to fall more quickly, opening them up for attack. Some enemies will glow red when they attempt to launch an unblockable attack. The player can either sidestep, dodge, or interrupt the attack by using Force abilities. The player has one lightsaber at the beginning of the game, and they can earn the ability to dual-wield a double-bladed lightsaber later in the game.

The player has access to several Force powers, which are used in both combat and puzzle scenarios. The player begins the game with a "force slow" ability that slows down enemies, and slowly earns more force powers such as wall-run, double-jump, force-push, and force-pull, allowing them to reach previously inaccessible areas. The usage of these Force powers is governed by the Force meter, which will replenish only when the player damages an enemy using regular attacks. As players progress in the game, they gain skill points which can be used to upgrade their combat skills, which are divided into three major categories: Survival, Lightsaber, and Force. Enemy types include wild beasts native to certain planets, as well as stormtroopers, droids, and Jedi-hunting Purge Troopers. The game's bosses include Inquisitors, bounty hunters, larger wild beasts, and large vehicles such as AT-STs. Some of the bosses are part of the main story, while others are optional. Throughout the game, the player is accompanied by a droid named BD-1. The droid helps the player access chests and terminals, as well as healing them using Stim Canisters. 

The game adopts the "Metroidvania" style of exploration and progression. It features five major explorable planets that players can return to regularly; Bogano, Zeffo, Kashyyyk, Dathomir and Ilum. The starship Stinger Mantis serves as the small hub area where the player can talk to non-playable characters, and is used to travel between planets. On each planet, the locations are interconnected, and players can find shortcuts to traverse areas more quickly. Many areas can only be accessed once the player unlocks new abilities or items. When requested, BD-1 projects a holographic map of the planet, including the location of the player's objectives. Doors that can be opened are highlighted in green, and gates that cannot be opened yet are highlighted in red. As the player explores different locations, BD-1 occasionally requests to scan items, granting players a small amount of experience points. Exploration reveals chests, which unlock cosmetic items that change the appearance of the player, their ship, and BD-1. The player can find "essence" items that give a permanent increases to their health or force meter, as well as "echoes" that reveal more of the game's story. BD-1 can be upgraded to help with navigation and combat, though some upgrades can be easily missed. Each level contains "meditation circles" where the player can save the game, spend skill points to update their character, and rest to recover health, healing items, and force energy. However, resting causes all enemies to respawn. Dying in battle costs players experience points, though lost XP can be regained by damaging the opponent that has previously killed the player.

With the addition of a Star Wars Day update released in 2020, players can access the Meditation Arena through the meditation circles. The arena offers combat challenges where the player fights waves of enemies based on locations from the main game. Completing a challenge awards the player with up to three stars, based on the player's health. These stars can be used to unlock cosmetic changes for BD-1. The Meditation Arena includes a battle grid, where players can select their abilities and opponents for a custom challenge.

Synopsis

Setting and characters 

Star Wars Jedi: Fallen Order takes place five years after the events of Revenge of the Sith, which leads to the fall of the democratic Galactic Republic and its peacekeeping organization Jedi Order and the rise of the totalitarian Galactic Empire. The game follows Jedi apprentice Cal Kestis (Cameron Monaghan) as he is being hunted by the Second Sister (Elizabeth Grullón) and her partner, the Ninth Sister (Misty Lee), both trained by the Sith Lord Darth Vader (Scott Lawrence) as part of the Imperial Inquisitors program. Supporting characters include former Jedi Knight-turned-mercenary Cere Junda (Debra Wilson), Greez Dritus (Daniel Roebuck), owner and pilot of the Stinger Mantis and Cere's friend, BD-1 (Ben Burtt), a small droid which befriends and accompanies Cal, Jedi Master Eno Cordova (Tony Amendola), who appears in hologram messages; Partisan leader Saw Gerrera (Forest Whitaker), Merrin (Tina Ivlev), one of the last surviving members of the Nightsister clan of Dathomir and Dark Jedi Taron Malicos (Liam McIntyre). Cal's former Jedi Master, Jaro Tapal (Travis Willingham), and numerous clone troopers (Dee Bradley Baker) appear in flashbacks.

Plot 
The story begins five years after the Galactic Republic's transformation into an Empire, and a purge of the old guard known as the Great Jedi Purge. Former Jedi Padawan Cal Kestis is hiding on the planet Bracca, where he works as a scrapper salvaging ships from the Clone Wars. An Imperial probe catches Cal using the Force to save his friend Prauf, and two Inquisitors are sent to investigate him. After the Second Sister kills Prauf for speaking up against the Empire, Cal makes his escape. He is rescued by former Jedi Knight Cere Junda and pilot Greez Dritus, who transport him on their ship, the Stinger Mantis.

Cere takes Cal to the planet Bogano in the hopes that he can access an ancient vault. On the way to the vault, Cal befriends a small droid named BD-1, who shows him a message from Cere's former Jedi Master Eno Cordova. It reveals that the vault was built by an ancient civilization called the Zeffo and that a Jedi Holocron containing a list of Force-sensitive children has been hidden inside by Cordova. Cere believes the list could help rebuild the Jedi Order, but the only way to access the vault is by following Cordova's path. Cal heads to the Zeffo homeworld and explores an ancient temple, finding a clue pointing to Cordova's friend, the Wookiee chieftain Tarfful. On the Wookiee homeworld of Kashyyyk, Cal encounters notorious insurgent Saw Gerrera, whom he helps free several Wookiees enslaved by the Empire.

Unable to find Tarfful, Cal returns to Zeffo to find more clues regarding the vault. He is ambushed by the Second Sister, who reveals herself as Trilla Suduri, Cere's former Padawan. She explains that she was captured by the Empire after Cere betrayed her hidden location under torture and warns Cal that Cere will inevitably betray him once they find the Holocron. Cal learns he requires a Zeffo artifact called an Astrium to unlock the vault, before being captured by a Haxion Brood bounty hunter and forced to fight in a gladiatorial arena owned by Haxion boss Sorc Tormo. After Cere and Greez rescue him, Cal returns to planet Kashyyyk to meet with Tarfful, who instructs him to investigate the top of the Origin Tree. At the top of the tree, he finds another recording of Cordova saying that an Astrium can be found in a Zeffo tomb on Dathomir before being attacked by the Ninth Sister, whom he defeats.

On Dathomir, Cal's progress is impeded by an army of revenants led by Nightsister Merrin, who blames the Jedi for the massacre of her people during the Clone Wars. Cal has a flashback of his former master Jaro Tapal sacrificing himself to protect him during Order 66, and the kyber crystal of Cal's lightsaber is destroyed. He meets former Jedi Taron Malicos, who crash-landed on Dathomir during the Purge and succumbed to the dark side of the Force, usurping leadership of the planet, as he seeks to learn the magic of the Nightsisters. Cal refuses Malicos' offer to teach him this dark power and flees after Merrin attacks them both. Aboard the Stinger Mantis, Cere admits she cut her connection to the Force after briefly falling to the dark side upon learning Trilla became an Inquisitor. After traveling to Ilum to rebuild his lightsaber, Cal returns to Dathomir, where he retrieves the Astrium and overcomes his guilt over Jaro's death. He defeats Malicos with the unexpected aid of Merrin, who agrees to join the Stinger Mantis crew.

Back on Bogano, Cal unlocks the vault, experiencing a vision where he rebuilds the Jedi Order, but they are defeated and tortured by the Empire, whom he eventually joins. After escaping the vision, Trilla attacks him and steals the Holocron. Cere reassumes her role as a Jedi and knights Cal before revealing she knows where Trilla is going. The pair infiltrate the Fortress Inquisitorius on Mustafar's oceanic moon Nur, battling their way through legions of stormtroopers before finally reaching Trilla. Cal defeats Trilla and retrieves the Holocron. Cere reconciles with Trilla, with the latter returning to the light for a brief moment before Darth Vader appears and kills her. Unable to defeat Vader, Cal and Cere escape from his grasp and are saved from drowning by Merrin. The crew celebrates their success on the Stinger Mantis, until they realize that the children listed on the Holocron will only be in more danger if they become Jedi. Cal destroys the Holocron with his lightsaber and asks where they will go next.

Development
Following his exit from Santa Monica Studio, Stig Asmussen, who had previously directed God of War III, joined Respawn Entertainment in 2014. He served as the studio's game director, leading the studio's second development team while the first development team was working on the Titanfall games. Prior to the game's development, Respawn discussed the possibility of making a Star Wars game with publisher Electronic Arts (EA), who controlled an exclusive license from Lucasfilm to develop new Star Wars games. This plan did not go through. When this plan did not go through, Respawn began development on an original game concept, and EA felt the project could work well as a Star Wars game. As owner of the Star Wars intellectual property, Lucasfilm was protective of the Jedi as a "sacred" part of the franchise, and encouraged Respawn to make a shooter game about a smuggler or bounty hunter. However, Asmussen pushed back with his vision, convincing Lucasfilm to focus on a game with Jedi and lightsaber combat. Lucasfilm would continue to check in with Asmussen and Respawn, ensuring the game's fidelity to the Star Wars setting. Visually, the game was heavily inspired by Rogue One and Solo: A Star Wars Story. The team also took inspirations from Star Wars Rebels, which took place in the same period.

Narrative

Aaron Contreras led the game's writing team, which included Chris Avellone, and several writers experienced with the Star Wars setting from their work on The Clone Wars and Rebels. The team wanted to develop a story between the events of Episode III and IV, to explore recognizable Star Wars elements that had been under-utilized in other media. Level designer Jeff Magers described the events after Episode III as "a perfect place for a video game hero, as a flickering candle of light in a very dark place." The team wanted to evoke feelings of the original trilogy, while creating an "authentic" Jedi story and a classic hero journey. At the beginning of the game, Cal is not yet a Jedi, as his training ended abruptly as the Jedi were purged during Order 66. Fallen Order, therefore, was envisioned as a "David and Goliath story", focusing on "the classic battle of good versus evil".

The writing team described "trauma" as one of the main themes, telling a story about how people react in moments of desperation. This was reflected through Cal's growing confidence in his abilities, and his gradual trust of his companions as they resist the Empire. Cameron Monaghan provided voice and motion capture for the character. The game chose a human protagonist as more relatable than an alien, and also decided he should be male to differentiate from Rey, the female lead in the sequel trilogy. Elizabeth Grullon provided the voice for the Second Sister. The character's British accent was improvised during the recording sessions as she "had a strong intuition" that Trilla had a British dialect when she first read the script. The character first appeared in comic series Darth Vader: Dark Lord of the Sith.

The ship Stinger Mantis was designed by Star Wars artist Doug Chiang. Its captain Greez Dritus belongs to a new alien species made for Fallen Order. According to Asmussen, the character was inspired by "John C. Reilly and Mr. Furley from Three's Company". BD-1 took two years to design. Throughout the game, Cal gradually bonded with BD-1, a relationship which Asmussen compared to that of Charlie Brown and his animal companions Snoopy and Woodstock. The droid was initially codenamed "bird dog", as its design was reminiscent to that of a bird, while having the personality of a dog. As a companion robot, Respawn designed it to be very "personable", and described it as Cal's best friend. The team initially design a bolster for BD-1 so he could fly around, but later settled for a bipedal design because the team wanted him to be an exploration droid. It has a pair of big eyes, which allow him to scan different objects and project a map hologram. The team initially brainstormed about giving the droid lines of dialogue, though ultimately decided to work with Ben Burtt to create its beeping sounds. Cal was initially envisioned as a "tinkerer" who would create BD-1 from scraps, and BD-1 would serve as Cal's backpack. This idea was abandoned. Early design of the BD-1 is reminiscent to that of BB-8 from the sequel trilogy, though they had to change its design once they saw the trailer for Star Wars: The Force Awakens. Purge Troopers were created in conjunction with Marvel Comics. While they were first seen in comic books, Fallen Order would mark their first appearance as enemy combatants.

Gameplay
Respawn wanted players to explore the world without needing excessive guidance. The team was inspired by the design of Metroid Prime, in particularly how frequent new upgrades are offered to players. The team believed that the game's Metroidvania structure enabled players to explore each location freely, while allowing the team to deliver occasional handcrafted moments. "Re-traversal" was one of the game's core design pillars. The Force powers, in particular, were described as "lock-and-key mechanisms" which can be used to solve puzzles and unlock secret areas. The game's Metroidvania design further reflected Cal's narrative growth as a character as he became more confident in himself and his connection with the Force. The game does not feature a fast travel system, as the team believed that players would explore each location more thoroughly and look for shortcuts when they are not allowed to skip through the critical path. 

The combat of the game was described to be "thoughtful" and "methodical". The team decided early in development that Jedi warriors focus on "precision and efficiency". It was not combo-based, as the team did not want players to mash buttons. Instead, the game was about striking at enemies and using Force abilities at the right moments and catching enemies off guard. The player must study an opponent's move set and react to them accordingly with different tactics and timing of attack. To stay true to the Star Wars universe, Cal can kill stormtroopers with one hit using his lightsaber. To make the combat more challenging, some enemies were designed with natural armor, and others were given a Block meter. To balance between challenging and accessible gameplay, the team looked for a middle ground between Metroid, The Legend of Zelda: Wind Waker, and games developed by FromSoftware such as Bloodborne and Dark Souls. In particular, the team did not want the game to be unforgiving or punishing. The team introduced difficulty modes that mainly change enemy aggression, as well as the player's parry timing and health loss. Even in the most difficult game mode, the design team wanted Cal's weapons to deliver lethal damage. As moments of dismemberment were rare in the Star Wars films, Lucasfilm and Respawn agreed that the game would not feature human dismemberment.

Music

Gordy Haab and Stephen Barton served as the game's composers. The former had previously composed the scores for Star Wars: The Old Republic and Star Wars: Battlefront while the latter had collaborated with the studio on the Titanfall, Uncharted, and Apex Legends. The score was recorded at Abbey Road Studios with the London Symphony Orchestra and the Bach Choir of London. According to the game's audio director Nick Laviers, the game's music was designed to evoke those from the original film trilogy, being both "futuristic" while having a "1970s, warm and familiar technology vibe". Haab described the score of the game as "dark", with some songs bordering on "gothic horror". The team felt that Cal's theme was challenging to create, since they did not want to foreshadow too much of his character development and his heroic journey. Haab intentionally avoided listening to established Star Wars music in order to create something new for Fallen Order. Mongolian folk metal band The Hu wrote and recorded a song, "Sugaan Essena", which featured prominently in the game. The song lyrics were written in Mongolian, then translated into a fictional Star Wars language.

Release
The project was revealed by publisher Electronic Arts to be a third-person action-adventure game set in the Star Wars universe in May 2016. Publisher Electronic Arts announced the game at E3 2018, At E3 2019, Electronic Arts showcased a 15-minute demo of the game. The game's development was completed on October 18, 2019, with Respawn confirming it had been declared gold, indicating it was being prepared for duplication and release. It was released for PlayStation 4, Windows, and Xbox One on November 15, 2019, a month before the theatrical release of Star Wars: The Rise of Skywalker. The release of Star Wars Jedi: Fallen Order marked EA's return to Steam, eight years after releasing games exclusively on its own Origin platform. The game was released in two editions: a Standard Edition, and a Deluxe Edition. The Deluxe Edition featured exclusive skins for BD-1 and the Stinger Mantis, a digital artbook, and a "Director's Cut" behind the scenes video. One of these cosmetics that were available through pre-ordering the game, the orange lightsaber crystal, was later made available through an update to all players. At launch, the game received criticisms for its abundance of software bugs. Respawn once considered delaying the title to further polish the game, but ultimately decided to release the game during the holiday season.

A Stadia version was released on November 24, 2020. A photo mode for the game was added in December 2019. On January 12, 2021, a free update was released that improved performance when running the game with backwards compatibility on PlayStation 5 and Xbox Series X/S. Native versions for the PlayStation 5 and Xbox Series X/S were released on June 11, 2021. The new versions improved the game's technical performance and stability, added support for higher resolutions, and vastly improved loading times. The update was free to those who owned either the PlayStation 4 or Xbox One versions of the game.  A free update with new cosmetics, game modes, and combat challenges was released on May 4, 2020, coinciding with Star Wars Day.

Tied-in media
In September 2019, Marvel Comics published a tie-in comic prequel series, Star Wars Jedi: Fallen Order – Dark Temple. Written by Matthew Rosenberg and illustrated by Paolo Villanelli, it follows Cere and her master Eno Cordova as they explore the planet Ontotho. In December 2019, Respawn added an outfit based on BD-1 to its online battle royale video game Apex Legends. Hasbro produced three figures in the Star Wars: The Black Series range for Cal Kestis (and BD-1), the Second Sister and the Purge Stormtrooper, with this selection of designs being adapted by Funko into Funko Pop! figures. Starting from March 2022, Cal's lightsaber hilt can be purchased at Dok-Ondar's Den of Antiquities in Star Wars: Galaxy's Edge in Disneyland Resort, and Disney's Hollywood Studios after winning a fan poll in 2020. At Star Wars Celebration 2022, Lego revealed a BD-1 Lego model based on the game.

Reception

Critical response

Star Wars Jedi: Fallen Order received "generally favorable reviews", according to review aggregator Metacritic. Critics liked the game for being a self-contained Star Wars single-player title, and felt that Fallen Order had successfully combined distinct systems from multiple game genres together. Many reviewers noted the game's subpar technical performance. The success of Star Wars: Jedi Fallen Order, alongside Marvel's Spider-Man, prompted Disney to encourage game developers to make more original games based on its properties.

The exploration aspect of the game was widely liked. Reiner described it as the game's "most dynamic and entertaining quality," though he felt some locations were designed in a "gamey" way that harmed immersion. He disliked sometimes having to revisit planets due to unimaginative narrative reasons. Hornshaw noted that each planet featured in the game was beautifully realized, and added that players were always well-rewarded for exploring off the beaten path. Ben Tyrer from GamesRadar praised the game's many locations as "intriguing", and compared the puzzles favorably to Tomb Raider. Stepleton applauded the team for their "attention to detail" and their devotion to stay true to the source materials, though he remarked the in-game Wookiees were "offensively ugly". Brad Shoemaker from Giant Bomb disliked the lack of a fast travel option, making exploration a "chore" early in the game. Tom Senior from PC Gamer described the game's locations as "massive, tangled dungeon with a good mix of gorgeous exteriors and atmospheric Imperial bases", but he noted that the third-person exploration gameplay was "old-fashioned". 

The combat was praised by critics. Reiner noted each swing of the lightsaber felt impactful and each combat encounter was an intense experience. Hornshaw and Senior lauded the difficult nature of the game, likening it to Sekiro: Shadows Die Twice. Hornshaw further added that each combat encounter can be an "exciting, cerebral exercise" because enemies can easily defeat the player. Both remarked that despite its challenging gameplay, it was rewarding enough for players to feel like they are controlling a powerful Jedi knight. He enjoyed the game for not giving Cal too much power, which in turn, made the Empire a "frightening threat" due to the differences in power level between the two. Tyrer remarked that the game was "demanding" but not "punishing" and praised the difficulty options for allowing players to fine tune their experience. VG247s Sherif Saed felt that the parrying mechanics were sometimes inconsistent and frustrating, and criticized several combat encounters where players are overwhelmed by too many enemies.

Andrew Reiner from Game Informer praised Cal as the game's protagonist and applauded the relationship between him and BD-1, likening the droid to a "friendly lapdog". He liked the story for its pacing and mystique and praised the flashback scenes for their character development. Phil Hornshaw from GameSpot also praised the droid's gameplay presence, which made it an inseparable part of the game. He enjoyed the narrative of the game, though he felt that it only started to excel when it began exploring the deepening friendship between Cal and the game's supporting characters. Cal was generally well-liked by critics, and the game's cast of supporting characters including Cere and Trilla also received praise. While Grubb praised the game's writing, he was disappointed that the story was a typical Star Wars story about light versus dark. Kat Bailey, writing for USgamer, added that the story progressed at a "breakneck speed", though she applauded the story's dark moments.

Sales

The PlayStation 4 version of Star Wars Jedi: Fallen Order sold 26,761 copies within its first week on sale in Japan, which made it the fifth bestselling retail game of the week. In the UK, it was the second bestselling retail game during its first week on sale, behind Pokémon Sword and Shield, with 66% of sales being for the PlayStation 4 version and the remaining 34% for the Xbox One version. It had the fourth most successful launch for a video game physical release in 2019. In the US, it was the second best-selling game in November and December 2019, only behind the Call of Duty: Modern Warfare reboot. With only two months of sales, it was still the sixth best-selling game of the year in the US, and Respawn's most profitable premium title of all-time.

Electronic Arts confirmed that Star Wars Jedi: Fallen Order had the fastest-selling digital launch for any Star Wars game within its first two weeks on sale. The game sold more than 8 million copies by the end of January 2020, exceeding EA's expectations. More than 10 million units were sold by March 31, 2020. By June 2021, the game had attracted more than 20 million players.

Awards

Sequel 

In January 2022, Respawn confirmed it was developing a sequel to Jedi: Fallen Order, with Stig Asmussen returning as director. Titled Star Wars Jedi: Survivor, it was unveiled in May and is scheduled for release in April 2023 for PlayStation 5, Windows, and Xbox Series X/S. Respawn will be collaborating with Lucasfilm Games for this sequel, which is set five years after Fallen Order. A tie-in novel titled Star Wars Jedi: Battle Scars is planned for release on March 7, 2023. The book is being written by Sam Maggs, and will bridge the events between Fallen Order and Survivor.

References

External links 
 

2019 video games
Action-adventure games
Electronic Arts games
Interactive Achievement Award winners
PlayStation 4 games
PlayStation 4 Pro enhanced games
PlayStation 5 games
Respawn Entertainment games
Science fiction video games
Single-player video games
Space opera video games
Stadia games
Star Wars video games
Unreal Engine games
Video games scored by Stephen Barton
Windows games
Xbox One games
Xbox Series X and Series S games
Metroidvania games
Soulslike video games
D.I.C.E. Award for Adventure Game of the Year winners
Video games developed in the United States